Luigi Mangiagalli (16 June 1850 – 3 July 1928) was an Italian scientist, patriot, philanthropist, politician and mayor of Milan.
He started teaching obstetrics and gynecology in Sassari, Catania, Pavia and Milan, where he also took the lead of the Istituto Ostetrico Ginecologico. 
His studies focused on the relationship between heart disease, pregnancy and surgery in neoplastic processes.
He promoted many charitable organizations such as: the Istituto Nazionale del cancro (dedicated to king Victor Emmanuel III), the transformation of la Maternità into a big gynecologic and obstetric institution and the foundation of la Città Universitaria.
In 1902 he became representative of the Chamber of Deputies and in 1905 he joined the Senate.
During the First World War, he took care of the soldiers and healed the wounded ones.
In 1926 he was nominated Minister of State.
He is registered in the Famedio.

Career 
• 1895-1902: Director of the Clinica Ginecologica of Pavia

• 1902-1905: Director of the Scuola Pareggiata di Ostetricia of Milan

• 1906-1925: Director of the Istituto di Ostetricia e Ginecologica degli Istituti Clinici di Perfezionamento

• 1922-1926: Mayor of Milan

• 1923-1926: First dean of the just founded University

• 11 November 1925: The farewell to teaching and the lively autobiography

• 1926: President of the Società Italiana di Ostetricia e Ginecologia

References
 http://notes9.senato.it/web/senregno.nsf/5a7602d7447e46e6c1257bb3004f0e3b/49034fd7ec42cac34125646f005d0334?OpenDocument
 http://www.policlinico.mi.it/AMM/StoriaCultura/Docs/Autobiografia_Documenti_Delle_Sue_Opere.pdf

1850 births
1928 deaths
19th-century Italian politicians
20th-century Italian politicians
Mayors of Milan